Khe may be,

the Khe language
the Newar name of the Nepali language